Utrecht Leidsche Rijn is a railway station in west Utrecht, Netherlands. The station opened on 9 June 2013 and is located on the Utrecht–Rotterdam railway. The station is primarily for the housing areas, Parkwijk and Terwijde Oost. Construction of the station started in the second half of 2009 and has four tracks with 2 platforms. The station is built across the A2 motorway.

Train services
The following services call at the station:

2x per hour local service (sprinter) Woerden - Utrecht - Houten - Tiel
2x per hour local service (sprinter) Den Haag - Gouda - Woerden - Utrecht - Houten - Geldermalsen - Tiel

External links
NS website 
Dutch Public Transport journey planner 

Leidsche Rijn
Railway stations opened in 2013